Mermaid Beach is an electoral district of the Legislative Assembly in the Australian state of Queensland. The district is based in the southern part of the Gold Coast.

Geography
A compact urban, coastal electorate, Mermaid Beach includes the Gold Coast suburbs of Mermaid Beach, Mermaid Waters, Broadbeach Waters, Merrimac, Miami and parts of Robina.

History
Essentially a new name for the former district of Robina, Mermaid Beach was first created for the 2009 state election. Its inaugural member is Ray Stevens, previously the member for Robina.

Members for Mermaid Beach

Election results

References

External links
 

Mermaid Beach